Protect (officially incorporated as National Association to Protect Children - PROTECT, Inc.) is a political organization established in 2002 and dedicated to the protection of children from abuse, exploitation, and neglect. It is a nonprofit 501(c)(4) membership association with members in every U.S. state and 10 nations. Protect achieved great success in its first three years, winning legislative victories in eight state legislatures. It advocates a nonpartisan "pro-child, anti-crime" agenda, and works closely with both conservative and liberal constituencies and lawmakers.

Protect Agenda and Campaigns

Pro-Child, Anti-Crime Agenda
Protect advocates a "pro-child, anti-crime" agenda, which combines traditionally liberal positions on child protection with traditionally conservative positions on crime. Protect's pro-child agenda includes legal advocacy for child victims and reform and adequate funding of child protective services. Its anti-crime agenda includes stronger criminal sentencing, surveillance and containment of released sex offenders and increased funding for law enforcement.

Protect Campaigns 
Protect focuses its work on four principal campaigns:

Circle of Trust Campaign: Since its creation in 2002, Protect has led successful legislative battles to eliminate laws that award preferential treatment to criminals who sexually assault their own children. Protect's Circle of Trust campaign has successfully fought to reform and strengthen laws in North Carolina, Arkansas, Illinois, Virginia, California and New York.

Real Safety Campaign: Protect also advocates intensive community supervision—or "surveillance and containment"—of convicted sex offenders released into communities. The Real Safety campaign educates the public and lawmakers about the dangers of relying upon sex offender registries and residency restriction laws to keep children safe, calling for long-term and lifetime probation and parole.

Accountability Campaign: In 2006, Protect announced it was launching its Accountability Campaign to hold public servants accountable for their performance in combatting crimes against children.

Child Pornography Campaign: In 2006, Protect also launched a national anti-child pornography campaign.

Grassroots Support
In 2005, the punk rock record label Fat Wreck Chords released a charity record for Protect, entitled Protect: A Benefit for the National Association to Protect Children. Fat Wreck Chords publicist Vanessa Burt and Verbicide Magazine publisher Jackson Ellis created the project, with the help of the head of Fat Wreck, Fat Mike.

In 2009, a second punk rock compilation charity record, Protect II: A Benefit for the National Association to Protect Children, was released jointly by Geykido Comet Records and Scissor Press.  This album was spearheaded by Verbicide publishers Jackson Ellis and Nate Pollard, along with Shahab Zargari and Heela Naqshband of GC Records.

NYDM, New York Death Militia, a worldwide metal music organization, sponsors metal music shows in support of Protect. 

Former child actress Alison Arngrim, who was a victim of sexual abuse, lobbies for and speaks for Protect.

See also 

 Child abuse
 Child pornography
 Child sexual abuse
 Incest

References

External links
Protect
Child Sexual Abuse and the State  by Ruby Andrew, UC Davis Law Review, vol. 39, 2006.  Discusses U.S. incest laws in cases where victim is a minor.
 The Incest Loophole  by Andrew Vachss, New York Times, Nov. 20, 2005.  Sentencing incest perpetrators when victim is a minor.
 Andrew Vachss speaks on the importance of Protect, "Family of Choice webcast," Jan. 14, 2009.

Political advocacy groups in the United States
Lobbying organizations in the United States
501(c)(4) nonprofit organizations
Organizations established in 2002